My Kind of Christmas is a 2000 Christmas album by Christina Aguilera.

My Kind of Christmas may also refer to:

My Kind of Christmas, novel by Robyn Carr 2002
My Kind of Christmas (Mike Douglas album), 1967
My Kind of Christmas, instrumental album by Gerald Wolfe 2002
My Kind of Christmas, compilation album by Dean Martin from Dean Martin discography
My Kind of Christmas (Reba McEntire album), 2016
My Kind of Christmas (song), a 1961 song by Johnny Mathis